Kurumbapalayam SSKulam is a part of  Coimbatore city in the state of Tamil Nadu, India. It is located on NH 209 (Sathy Road) between Saravanampatti and Annur.

Geography
Kurumbapalayam SSKulam is situated just 13.5 km away from the heart of the City Gandhipuram. The nerve centre of this place is Sathy Road. Kurumbapalayam SSKulam shares border with Saravanampatti, kondaiyapalayam, Varithaiyangarpalayam, Sarcarsamakulam,  Pethanayakanpalayam, and Vazhiampalayam. It also has access roads directly to Coimbatore International Airport via Kalappatti.

Organizations and People
Kurumbapalayam has many upcoming industries and educational institutions. Adithya College is one of the famous institutions in kurumbapalayam. Other institutions in this location are SNS College, KV Institute of Management, KV Matriculation School, Sri Guru College of Technology, Adithya Public Matriculation School

Population
According to India Census 2001, Kurumbapalayam has an approximate population of 5,000 and considered densely populated area in Sarcarsamakulam.

Roads
Due to rapid development in the past decade, government has planned to decongest the Coimbatore City roads. The State Highways Department has decided to develop Peelamedu–Kalapatti-Saravanampatty and Kurumbapalayam Road into a Ring road. According to the Highways sources, the 12-km stretch from SITRA Junction in Peelamedu would run through Kalapatti and join Sathyamangalam Road at Saravanampatti and then it would join Mettuppalayam Road at Thudiyalur. On completion of this stretch the Sathy Road in Ganapathy area will have  option of diverting through either sides i.e. to Avinashi Road or to Mettupalayam Road without going to Gandhipuram.

Education
Major Education Institutions located in Kurumbapalayam SSKulam are:

Schools
 Government Primary School
 Government Higher Secondary School
 The Indian Public School, Coimbatore
 KV Matriculation Higher Secondary School
 Adithya Public Matric School

Colleges
 Adithya Institute of Technology (AIT), Coimbatore
 Sri Guru Institute of Technology, Coimbatore
 Info Institute of Engineering, Coimbatore

References

Neighbourhoods in Coimbatore